Louise Götz (1772-?), was a Swedish stage actress.   She belonged to the elite of the pioneer generation actors of the Royal Dramatic Theatre (1788-1805).

She was the daughter of Louis Götz, who was a wig maker of the Royal Swedish Opera.  She married Gabriel Saint-Remy, a servant of the royal court, and was thus known as Louise Saint-Remy until her divorce, when she called herself Mrs Götz.

As many other of the pioneer generation of actors at the Royal Dramatic Theatre, Louise Götz was engaged as an actress at the theater of Adolf Fredrik Ristell, which was founded in 1787, and transferred to the staff of the Royal Dramatic Theatre when the Ristell theatre when bankrupt and was transformed to the Royal Dramatic Theatre, which was founded in 1788.

Louise Götz belonged to the more famed of the actors of the theater.  Described as pretty and sensual, she was hugely popular in soubrette- and breeches roles and received one of the highest salaries of the theater.

In 1803, a French theater company was engaged by king Gustav IV Adolf of Sweden to perform in Stockholm, and Louise Götz reportedly married one of its members and accompanied him when the French theater company left Sweden again in 1805.

References 

1772 births
Year of death unknown
18th-century Swedish actresses
19th-century Swedish actresses
Swedish stage actresses